Kate Maki (born Katherine Ellen Maki) is a Canadian singer-songwriter.

Biography
Maki is of Finnish descent. Born and raised in Sudbury, Ontario, she studied neuroscience at Dalhousie University in Halifax, Nova Scotia and education at Nipissing University in North Bay, Ontario. She taught special education, French and science in Ottawa, Toronto and Sudbury for several years before deciding to pursue a full-time musical career.

In 2003, Maki recorded her debut album, Confusion Unlimited, with Dave Draves at Little Bullhorn Studios in Ottawa, Ontario. The album's blend of folk rock and alternative country earned her favourable reviews and quickly sold out its initial printing. In 2004, she returned to Little Bullhorn Studios to record her second album, The Sun Will Find Us. Both albums received Album of the Year awards at the Northern Ontario Music and Film Awards in 2004 and 2005.

In 2005, Maki, Nathan Lawr, Ryan Bishops, Ruth Minnikin and Dale Murray participated in two national concert tours, A Midautumn Night's Dream and A Midwinter Night's Dream, which were reportedly inspired by Bob Dylan's Rolling Thunder Revue. The five musicians also recorded limited edition tour compilations for each tour.

Maki took a break from touring between 2006 and 2008 and returned home to Sudbury, Ontario to teach high school science.

During March Break 2007, Maki recorded her third album, On High, at Little Bullhorn Studios with Howe Gelb as producer and Dave Draves as engineer. It was released in North America on February 12, 2008, and was awarded Album of the Year at the Northern Ontario Music and Film Awards in 2009.

While touring the United States in 2008, Maki stopped at WaveLab in Tucson, Arizona for two days to record her fourth album, Two Song Wedding, which was released in January 2010.

In the fall of 2010, Maki and fellow Canadian songwriter Frederick Squire travelled to Paco Loco Studio in El Puerto de Santa Maria to record two country songs. Calling It Quits/Crazy Tropical Survival Guide was released as a seven-inch two-song single and digital download on March 22, 2011.

After touring Canada together in 2011 in support of their seven-inch as well as Maki's fifth solo album, Moonshine, and Squire's second solo album, Frederick Squire Sings Shenandoah and Other Popular Hits, the duo decided to take a break from touring and settled in Copper Cliff, Ontario to start a family. Squire and Maki were married on December 22, 2012.

Maki's most recent album, Head in the Sand, was released in May 2016.

Discography

Albums
Confusion Unlimited (2003)
The Sun Will Find Us (2004)
On High (2008)
Two Song Wedding (2010)
Moonshine (2011)
Head in the Sand (2016)

Tour Compilations
A Midwinter Night's Dream (2005)
A Midautumn Night's Dream (2005)

Singles
Calling It Quits/Crazy Tropical Survival Guide (2011, with Frederick Squire)

As Guest Musician
vocals:  "Cocaine Cowgirl" and "St. George's Lane" - Matt Mays - Matt Mays + El Torpedo (2004)
vocals/electric guitar:  "Covering Up" - Nathan Lawr - Secret Carpentry (2005)
vocals:  "Mountain of Love" - Howe Gelb - Sno Angel Like You (2006)

References

External links
Official website Kate Maki
Facebook 

Canadian folk singer-songwriters
Canadian women singer-songwriters
Living people
Musicians from Greater Sudbury
Dalhousie University alumni
Canadian people of Finnish descent
Canadian alternative country singers
Canadian folk rock musicians
Year of birth missing (living people)